Jean Gascou (16 May 1945, Cambrai) is a French scholar and papyrologist. He is a professor at the University Paris-Sorbonne, director of the Institute of papyrology and a member of the Institut Universitaire de France.

Selected publications 
Jean Gascou is the author of several works:

References

External links 
 Jean Gascou on data.bnf.fr
 Fiscalité et société en Égypte byzantine
 Interview with J. Gascou
 List of works and articles

French papyrologists
French Byzantinists
École Normale Supérieure alumni
People from Cambrai
1945 births
Living people
Academic staff of Paris-Sorbonne University